Bridgeport Harbor is an inlet on the north side of Long Island Sound in Bridgeport, Connecticut. It was carved by the retreat of the glaciers during the last ice age approximately 13,000 years ago.

Bridgeport Harbor is a federal shipping port and a terminus of the Bridgeport & Port Jefferson Steamboat Company, one of the oldest ferry companies in the nation.  It is due east of the smaller Black Rock Harbor which is also in the city of Bridgeport.

A section of the harbor is planned to be reconstructed as a offshore wind port, serving the Vineyard Wind and Park City Wind projects.

Geography
Bridgeport's Success Lake (Connecticut) and Stilman Pond both egress via the Yellow Mill Channel and into the tidal marsh at the top of the harbor. The Pequonnock River empties into the inlet on its north end while the Tongue Point Light is at the western end of the mouth of the harbor.

Notable structures in or near the harbor

Arena at Harbor Yard, a 10,000 seat capacity basketball, hockey and sporting venue. 
The Ballpark at Harbor Yard, a 5,300 seat outdoor venue which is home to the Bridgeport Bluefish baseball team. 
Berkshire No. 7, a shipwreck, sank in 1974 along with the Elmer S. Dailey and the Priscilla Dailey
Pequonnock River Railroad Bridge is listed on the National Register of Historic Places.
Pleasure Beach, also known as "Steeplechase Island" is a former amusement park and ghost town.  It is the site of the transmission towers for WICC (AM). 
The PSEG Bridgeport Harbor Generating Station is a familiar piece of the Bridgeport skyline.

History
Originally used for shipbuilding, it now operates mainly as a shipping port. The harbor was dredged by the Army Corps of Engineers in 1964. Current plans to dredge it again have met with opposition from residents of New Haven due to plans to dump the dredged material at Morris Cove.

A 4000-ton dry dock was opened in 2010.

Transportation
The Bridgeport & Port Jefferson Ferry is berthed in the harbor. 
The harbor is located at the end of 8/25 connector, where it merges into Interstate 95, near the Bridgeport (Metro-North station), a stop for Amtrak, Metro-North and Shoreline East trains.

See also

Bridgeport Harbor Light

References

External links
Bridgeport Harbor Tide Table from CT Department of Environmental Protection

Economy of Bridgeport, Connecticut
Geography of Bridgeport, Connecticut
Geography of Fairfield County, Connecticut
Long Island Sound
Transportation in Fairfield County, Connecticut
Ports and harbors of Connecticut